Merchicha is a village in the Boumerdès Province in Kabylie, Algeria.

Location
The village is surrounded by Meraldene and the town of Thenia in the Khachna mountain range.

Notable people

 Mohamed Missouri (1947-2015), boxer and coach

References

Villages in Algeria
Boumerdès Province
Kabylie